This list is of the Places of Scenic Beauty of Japan located within the Prefecture of Kagawa.

National Places of Scenic Beauty
As of 1 January 2021, six Places have been designated at a national level (including one *Special Place of Scenic Beauty).

Prefectural Places of Scenic Beauty
As of 1 May 2020, two Places have been designated at a prefectural level.

Municipal Places of Scenic Beauty
As of 1 May 2020, nine Places have been designated at a municipal level.

Registered Places of Scenic Beauty
As of 1 January 2021, one Monument has been registered (as opposed to designated) as a Place of Scenic Beauty at a national level.

See also
 Cultural Properties of Japan
 List of Historic Sites of Japan (Kagawa)
 List of parks and gardens of Kagawa Prefecture

References

External links
  Cultural Properties in Kagawa Prefecture
  National and Prefectural Places of Scenic Beauty in Kagawa Prefecture

Tourist attractions in Kagawa Prefecture
Places of Scenic Beauty